K. R. Tony (born 23 May 1964) is an Indian poet and translator from Kerala.

Works
K. R. Tony has been contributing poems and poetic studies in literary journals and periodicals of Kerala since 1980.  His collections are:

 Samanila 
 Andhakandam
 Daivappathi. 
 Oh! Nishada  
 Plamenammayi 
 Yakshiyum Mattum 
 Hporezhuth

Awards
 1999 Vyloppilly Award 
 2000  Kerala Sahitya Akademi Kanakasree Award
 2013 Kerala Sahitya Akademi Award
 2014  VT Kumaran Award 
 2014 Ayanam A Ayyappan Award 
 2016 First Sree Kerala Varma Award

References

External links
http://www.indulekha.com/index.php?route=product/author/info&author_id=3349
http://www.maebag.com/Product/23259/PLAMENAMMAYI

1964 births
Poets from Kerala
Living people
Writers from Thrissur
Malayalam-language writers